Carex alboviridis is a tussock-forming perennial in the family Cyperaceae. It is native to southern parts of Madagascar.

See also
List of Carex species

References

alboviridis
Endemic flora of Madagascar
Plants described in 1891
Taxa named by Charles Baron Clarke